The Battle of Sabzak was a part of the War in Afghanistan that took place between 3 and 4 September 2009 on Sabzak pass in the province of Badghis, between Spanish and Italian forces of NATO's Afghan branch, against Taliban forces and militant Tajik tribals.

NATO ordered Spain to place a patrol on the pass, the only road supplying Qal'eh-ye and Herat after numerous attacks on military convoys throughout the summer and after the collapse of the Taliban's control on the area. Taliban mullah, Jamuladdin Mansoor, allied with Tajik tribals on both sides of the road tried to prevent passage with help from Ishan Khan.

The Spanish forces took control of the road on Monday 31 July. The insurgents reorganized themselves, starting the first battle on 3 September, resulting in an injured Spanish soldier.

The next day, a convoy of 30 vehicles and 100 Spaniards oversaw the meeting between another convoy and the Afghan police for protection, but it was ambushed from four points in a planned operation. The troops retaliated, calling in aerial support. Two Italian helicopters were brought, but refused aerial bombardment due to the proximity to a civilian population. After six hours of fighting, the Taliban and their allies withdrew to the village of Marghozar.

One soldier from the Spanish contingency was injured, and two vehicles were rendered unusable. 13 insurgents had been killed, and 3 were injured.

References 

Sabzak
History of Badghis Province
2009 in Spain
Sabzak
2009 in Afghanistan
Taliban attacks
Afghanistan conflict (1978–present)
Sabzak
Sabzak